Tamer Farid (born 10 August 1968) is an Egyptian diver. He competed in the men's 3 metre springboard event at the 1984 Summer Olympics.

References

External links
 

1968 births
Living people
Egyptian male divers
Olympic divers of Egypt
Divers at the 1984 Summer Olympics
Place of birth missing (living people)